Daniel Wayne Smith (January 22, 1986 – September 10, 2006) was the son of the American model and actress Anna Nicole and Billy Smith. He occasionally appeared in his mother's E! Network reality TV show. Smith died on September 10, 2006, at age 20, after an accidental overdose.

Life
Smith was born on January 22, 1986, in Mexia, Texas, to Billy Wayne Smith and Vickie Lynn Hogan (alias Anna Nicole Smith). After his parents separated in 1987, Daniel was raised by his mother and maternal grandmother, Virgie  Arthur, in Texas until he was six years old. He attended North Hollywood High School in Los Angeles. He was the stepson of J. Howard Marshall II, whom his mother met at a strip club and married in 1994.

At age 16, Smith was featured as himself on his mother's reality television series, The Anna Nicole Show, which ran on the E! Entertainment Television channel from 2002 to 2004. In a second-season episode he would mention that he no longer wanted to be part of the show. He was also seen with his mother in E! True Hollywood Story. Daniel played bit parts in two of his mother's films, Skyscraper and To the Limit. Described by his mother as a straight-A honor student, he had last been attending classes at Los Angeles Valley College in the summer of 2006.

Death
Smith died in his mother's hospital room while visiting her at the maternity ward in Doctors Hospital in Nassau, Bahamas, on September 10, 2006, just three days after she had given birth to his half-sister Dannielynn Birkhead. Cyril Wecht, an American forensic pathologist, stated Daniel Smith accidentally overdosed on methadone and  antidepressants. Larry Birkhead, testifying at an inquest, stated that security in the house indicated that Daniel had stolen his mother's methadone, actually used drugs with his mother, and lost about twenty pounds before his death.

Investigation and inquest
Her Majesty's Coroner announced on September 12 that: "The cause of death is not natural. However, we wish to reserve the cause of death at this time pending the toxicologist examination and report for confirmation of cause of death. Friday is the likely release date for the autopsy and toxicology report."
The following day, the chief inspector of the coroner's office, told the Associated Press whenever there is a suspicious death we would have an inquest to determine how the person died,"
 
Attorney Michael Scott, read a prepared statement: "The devastation and grief over Daniel's sudden death coupled with the sedation has been so extreme that Anna Nicole experienced memory loss of the event. Anna Nicole was so distraught at the loss of Daniel that she refused to leave his side and it was necessary to sedate her in order to check her out of the hospital," Scott said that the third person in the room at the time of the death was another one of Anna Nicole Smith's attorneys, Howard K. Stern. Mr. Scott was a partner in the law firm Callenders and Co. and would later reveal that he had been asked by the real estate developer G. Ben Thompson and an associate, who he said were friends of Ms. Smith, to act on her behalf after the sudden death of her 20-year-old son Daniel. Scott, Callenders and Co., and G. Ben Thompson were to figure prominently as Anna Nicole Smith's adversaries in the highly politicized Bahamian residency scandal surrounding her disputed home ownership.

On September 20, 2006, authorities issued a death certificate for the son of Anna Nicole Smith but left the cause of death undetermined pending toxicology tests.
The long-awaited inquest in the Bahamas into the death  of  Daniel started on October 30, 2007.

In March 2008, Bahamas jury determined that Anna Nicole Smith's son died from an accidental drug overdose and recommended no criminal charges.

Funeral in the Bahamas
Howard K. Stern told Florida Circuit Judge Larry Seidlin during his testimony at Anna Nicole Smith's baby custody trial following her death: "At Daniel's funeral, she had them open the coffin and tried to climb inside. She said that "If Daniel has to be buried, I want to be buried with him," Stern testified. "She was ready to go down with him." Howard K. Stern revealed that "Anna saw herself as both mother and father to Daniel. From the time I met her, everything was for Daniel. I would say that physically, she died last week, but in a lot of ways, emotionally she died when Daniel died."

On October 7, Daniel's friends and family, including his father Billy Smith and grandmother Virgie Arthur, gathered at the First Baptist Church of Mexia for a separate memorial service while Anna Nicole remained with Howard K. Stern in the Bahamas. Daniel was eulogized at the service by his great-grandfather Gus Moser. Daniel was finally buried at New Providence, Bahamas, on October 19, 2006. According to Howard K. Stern, Smith's long-time companion, she was devastated over her son's death. "Anna and Daniel were inseparable. Daniel was without question the most important person in Anna's life."

Independent autopsy
Dr. Cyril Wecht was hired by Callenders and Co., a Bahamian law firm, to do an independent autopsy. Wecht stated Daniel Smith died as a result of the interaction of methadone, an analgesic, and the antidepressants Zoloft and Lexapro. The metabolism and the breakdown of the methadone is delayed in the presence of Zoloft, according to Wecht. Methadone can alter the cardiac rhythm – it's referred to as a prolongation of the QT interval. "When that is prolonged, the individual could even lose consciousness, and suffer cardiac dysrhythmia. And that is something that can happen from methadone alone, and in the presence of Zoloft and Lexapro, it is more likely to happen," "I don't mean frequently, and certainly not predictably, so tragically, with this young man this is what happened. So I have no question at all as to the cause of death."

Wecht later told the press that he had not been paid. He told the Bahamas Journal that he had originally been contacted by Michael Scott, and was ostensibly working with him and Tracey Ferguson (of Callenders and Co.). Scott and Ferguson dropped out of the picture, and attorney Wayne Munroe took over Ms. Smith's representation. "I believe, quite frankly, that there has been some breakdown in communication, and quite possibly some antagonism. Scott and Ferguson were representing real estate developer G. Ben Thompson in an action against Anna Nicole Smith over her house in the Bahamas.

On February 8, 2007, Wecht said on Fox News that there was still no information available as to how Daniel obtained methadone. Although methadone is prescribed in place of other opioids for pain relief and is used in the treatment of heroin and morphine addiction, Wecht had said he had no information to make any conclusion about why Daniel was using it. On February 14, it was reported that his mother Anna Nicole Smith had been given a prescription for methadone under a false name while she was in her eighth month of pregnancy. Ford Shelley claimed that methadone was found in Anna's bedroom refrigerator while her Bahamas mansion was being reclaimed by his father-in-law, real estate developer G. Ben Thompson.

Anna Nicole Smith estate
Anna Nicole Smith died suddenly on February 8, 2007, less than five months after her son's death. Florida circuit court judge Larry Seidlin, who oversaw the disposition of Smith's body, ordered Anna Nicole Smith's will produced. It was released on February 16, 2007. The "Will of Vickie Lynn Marshall" was signed on July 30, 2001, and declares:
I am unmarried. I have one child DANIEL WAYNE SMITH. I have no deceased children nor predeceased children leaving issue. Except as otherwise provided in this Will, I have intentionally omitted to provide for my spouse and other heirs, including future spouses and children and other descendants now living and those hereafter born or adopted, as well as existing and future stepchildren and foster children.
All of the property of my estate ... shall be distributed to HOWARD K. STERN, Esq., to hold in trust for my child under such terms as he and a court of competent jurisdiction may declare, such that my children are distributed sufficient sums...and support according to their accustomed manner of living....

References

External links

Anna Nicole's official website

Accidental deaths in the Bahamas
People from Mexia, Texas
1986 births
2006 deaths
Drug-related deaths in the Bahamas
Anna Nicole Smith